The Medal of Performing Combat/Vital Mission  is a military decoration awarded by the Central Military Commission of China. It has two types: the Medal of Performing Combat Mission and the Medal of Performing Vital Mission.

Criteria 
The medal is awarded to military officers, civilian cadres and soldiers who have performed missions such as combat, disaster relief, counter-terrorism operations and maintaining stability, responding to emergencies, etc.

Service Ribbon

References 

Awards established in 2011
Military awards and decorations of the People's Liberation Army